Bursera excelsa, the copal, is a species of plants found along the Pacific coast of Mexico.

References

External links 

  
 Bursera excelsa at The Plant List

excelsa
Flora of Mexico